Pneumatosis intestinalis (also called intestinal pneumatosis, pneumatosis cystoides intestinalis, pneumatosis coli, or intramural bowel gas) is pneumatosis of an intestine, that is, gas cysts in the bowel wall. As a radiological sign it is highly suggestive for necrotizing enterocolitis. This is in contrast to gas in the intestinal lumen (which is relieved by flatulence). In newborns, pneumatosis intestinalis is considered diagnostic for necrotizing enterocolitis, and the gas is produced by bacteria in the bowel wall. The pathogenesis of pneumatosis intestinalis is poorly understood and is likely multifactorial.  PI itself is not a disease, but rather a clinical sign.  In some cases, PI is an incidental finding, whereas in others, it portends a life-threatening intra-abdominal condition.


Additional images

References

External links 

Gastrointestinal tract disorders
Radiologic signs